Kurvelesh is a former municipality in the Gjirokastër County, southern Albania. At the 2015 local government reform it became a subdivision of the municipality Tepelenë. The population at the 2011 census was 705. The municipal unit consists of the villages Progonat, Lekdush, Gusmar, Nivicë and Rexhin.

History

Ottoman 
In the early 20th century a çetë (armed band) consisting of 200 activists of the Albanian National Awakening was formed in Kurvelesh.

Notable people 
Hodo Nivica (1809-1852), leader of the Albanian Revolt of 1847.
Sali Nivica (1890-1920), Albanian publicist and patriot

References

Former municipalities in Gjirokastër County
Administrative units of Tepelenë